KDWD is a radio station airing a country music format licensed to Marceline, Missouri, broadcasting on 99.1 MHz FM. The station is owned by Aaron Ervie, through licensee Main Street USA Communications, LLC.

References

External links

Country radio stations in the United States
DWD
Radio stations established in 2011
2011 establishments in Missouri